The 1892–93 United States Senate elections were held on various dates in various states, coninciding with former Democratic President Grover Cleveland's return to power. As these U.S. Senate elections were prior to the ratification of the Seventeenth Amendment in 1913, senators were chosen by state legislatures. Senators were elected over a wide range of time throughout 1892 and 1893, and a seat may have been filled months late or remained vacant due to legislative deadlock. In these elections, terms were up for the senators in Class 1.

The Republican Party lost nine seats, losing its majority to the Democratic Party. The Democratic majority, however, was minimal and did not last past the next Congress.

Results summary 
Senate party division, 53rd Congress (1893–1895)

 Majority party: Democratic (43)
 Minority party: Republican (37)
 Other parties: Populist (3); Silver (1)
 Vacant: 4
 Total seats: 88

Change in Senate composition

Before the elections

Result of the elections

Beginning of the next Congress

Race summaries

Elections during the 52nd Congress 
In these special elections the winners were seated during the 52nd Congress in 1892 or in 1893 before March 4; ordered by election date.

In this special election, the winner was seated in the 53rd Congress, starting March 4, 1893.

In this early regular election, the winner was seated in the 54th Congress, starting March 4, 1895.

Races leading to the 53rd Congress 
In these regular elections, the winners were elected for the term beginning March 4, 1893; ordered by state.

All of the elections involved the Class 1 seats.

Elections during the 53rd Congress 
In these elections, the winners were elected in 1893 after March 4, and seated in the 53rd Congress.

In this election, the winner was seated in the 54th Congress, starting March 4, 1895.

California

Connecticut

Delaware

Florida

Florida (regular)

Florida (special)

Indiana

Kansas (special)

Kentucky (special)

Maine

Maryland

Maryland (regular) 

Arthur Pue Gorman won re-election against Lloyd Lowndes Jr. by a margin of 86.05%, or 74 votes, for the Class 1 seat.

Maryland (special) 

Charles Hopper Gibson was elected to fill the seat vacated by Ephraim King Wilson II by a margin of 69.03%, or 78 votes, for the Class 3 seat.

Massachusetts

Michigan

Minnesota

Mississippi

Mississippi (regular, class 1)

Mississippi (regular, class 2) 

Early election for the term beginning in 1895.

Missouri

Montana

Nebraska

Nevada

New Jersey

New York 

The New York election was held on January 18, 1893, by the New York State Legislature.

Incumbent Senator Frank Hiscock was elected to this seat in 1887, with his term to expire on March 3, 1893.

At the controversial State election in November 1891, 17 Democrats,  14 Republicans and 1 Independent were elected for a two-year term (1892-1893) in the State Senate. This was the only time a Democratic majority was seated in the State Senate between 1874 and 1910. At the State election in November 1892, 74 Democrats and 54 Republicans were elected for the session of 1893 to the Assembly. The 116th New York State Legislature met from January 3 to April 20, 1893, at Albany, New York.

The Democratic caucus met on January 10. 90 State legislators attended, only Assemblyman John Cooney, of Brooklyn, was absent due to illness. State Senator Amasa J. Parker Jr. presided. Edward Murphy Jr., a wealthy brewer of Troy, and Chairman of the Democratic State Committee, was nominated by a large majority. The New York Times had suggested earlier to nominate Carl Schurz, a former Republican U.S. Senator from Missouri and U.S. Secretary of the Interior, who lived now in New York City,  but the political machines of upstate boss David B. Hill and Tammany Hall chose a loyal party machine man rather than an Ex-Republican advocate of civil service reform. Even President-elect Grover Cleveland had voiced his disapproval of Murphy, to no avail.

The Republican caucus met on January 11. State Senator Thomas Hunter presided. They re-nominated the incumbent U.S. Senator Frank Hiscock by acclamation.

Edward Murphy, Jr., was the choice of both the Assembly and the State Senate, and was declared elected. State Senator James T. Edwards (32nd D.), of Randolph, voted for the defeated Republican vice presidential candidate of 1892, Whitelaw Reid.

Note: The votes were cast on January 17, but both Houses met in a joint session on January 18 to compare nominations, and declare the result.

When Murphy took his seat, for the first time since 1849 New York was represented by two Democrats in the U.S. Senate. Murphy served a single term, remaining in the U.S. Senate until March 3, 1899. In January 1899, Murphy was defeated for re-election by Republican Chauncey M. Depew.

North Dakota

Ohio

Pennsylvania 

The election in Pennsylvania was held January 17, 1893. Incumbent Matthew Quay was re-elected by the Pennsylvania General Assembly.

|- bgcolor ="#EEEEEE"
| colspan ="3" align="right" | Totals
| align ="right" | 254
| align ="right" | 100.00%

|}

Rhode Island

Tennessee

Texas

Texas (regular)

Texas (special)

Vermont

Vermont (regular)

Vermont (special)

Virginia

Virginia (regular, class 1) 

Incumbent Senator John W. Daniel (who had been first elected in 1887) was re-elected in 1893.

Virginia (regular, class 2) 

Incumbent Senator John S. Barbour Jr. died May 14, 1892.  Democrat Eppa Hunton was appointed May 28, 1892, to continue until a special election.

Hunton was elected early December 19, 1893, to the term that would begin in 1895.

Virginia (special) 

Democratic incumbent John S. Barbour Jr. died May 14, 1892.  Democrat Eppa Hunton was appointed May 28, 1892, to continue until a special election.

Hunton was elected December 20, 1893, to finish the term (ending March 1895).

Washington

West Virginia

West Virginia (regular)

West Virginia (special)

Wisconsin 

Two-term Republican Philetus Sawyer retired and two-term Democratic congressman John L. Mitchell was elected to the next term.  In the Wisconsin Legislature, Democrats had a majority, but it took 31 ballots for Democrats to pick Mitchell over fellow Democrats John H. Knight and Edward S. Bragg.

Wyoming

See also 
 1892 United States elections
 1892 United States presidential election
 1892 United States House of Representatives elections
 52nd United States Congress
 53rd United States Congress

Notes

References

Sources